Partition function may refer to:
 Rotational partition function
 Vibrational partition function
Partition function (number theory)
Partition function (mathematics), which generalizes its use in statistical mechanics and quantum field theory:
Partition function (statistical mechanics)
Partition function (quantum field theory)